The 2016 Betfair Mosconi Cup, the 23rd edition of the annual nine-ball pool competition between teams representing Europe and the United States, took place 6–9 December 2016 at the Alexandra Palace in London, England.


Teams

Results

Tuesday, 6 December
Day review:

Wednesday, 7 December
Day review:

Thursday, 8 December
Day review:

Friday, 9 December
Day review:

References

External links
 Official homepage

2016
2016 in cue sports
Mosconi Cup
2016 in English sport
2016
Mosconi Cup
Alexandra Palace